The Chrobry Oak is an oak tree, the largest oak in Poland and one of the biggest in Europe.

It is monumental oak with single-stemmed, hollow trunk, its girth was 1004 cm, height – 26 m and volume – 90 m³ (in 2014). Moreover, it is the oldest oak tree in Poland. Age of the Chrobry is about 760 years, according to dendrochronological research.

Oak was officially preserved (as a natural monument) since 1966.

Chrobry was measured in 1908 at the earliest, by Theodor Schube (German botanist), girth of the tree was 861 cm.

Tree was set on fire by vandals on November 2014. Chrobry remained in fatal condition, but in 2015 part of the crown was still alive.

See also
Bartek (oak)
Bażyński Oak

References

Further reading
 Paweł Zarzyński, Robert Tomusiak, Krzysztof Borkowski, Drzewa Polski, PWN, Warszawa, 2016, 
 Krzysztof Borkowski, Polskie drzewa, Wyd. DALPO, Poznań, 2014, 
 Paweł Zarzyński, Robert Tomusiak, 90 drzew – Okazy niezwykłe Centrum Informacyjne Lasów Państwowych, Warszawa, 2014, 

Individual oak trees
Landmarks in Poland
Natural monuments of Poland
Individual trees in Poland